The Minister of the Interior is a cabinet position in the Gambia that oversees the Ministry of the Interior. The Ministry is responsible for immigration, visas, the police force, the prison service and registering NGOs.

List of Ministers of the Interior 
 Abdoulie Sulayman Mboob, 1965 - 1987
 Lamin Kitty Jabang, 1987 - 1994
 Sadibou Hydara, 1994 - 27 January 1995
 Lamin Kaba Bajo, 27 January 1995 - 8 March 1997
 Momodou Bojang, 8 March 1997 - 27 January 1999
 Ousman Badjie, 27 January 1999 - 29 September 2003
 Sulayman M. Ceesay, 29 September 2003 - 4 May 2004
 Samba Bah, 4 May 2004 - 29 March 2005
 Baboucarr Jatta, 29 March 2005 - 22 November 2006
 Ousman Sonko, 22 November 2006 - 16 April 2012
 Lamin Kaba Bajo, 16 April 2012 - 7 May 2012
 Ousman Sonko, 7 May 2012 - 19 September 2016
 Momodou Alieu Bah, 19 September 2016 - 18 January 2017
 Mai Ahmed Fatty, 1 February 2017 - 10 November 2017
 Habib Saihou Drammeh, 4 December 2017 - 8 January 2018
 Ebrima M. Mballow, 8 January 2018 - 22 August 2019
 Yankuba Sonko, 22 August 2019 – present

References 

Interior ministers of the Gambia
Lists of government ministers of the Gambia
Law enforcement in the Gambia